Bergen Township was a township that existed in Bergen County, New Jersey. The township was created on February 21, 1893, from the southern section of Lodi Township (now South Hackensack):  Another township with the same name, Bergen Township, was created 200 years earlier.

The borough of Carlstadt was formed on June 27, 1894, from portions of the township, at the height of the Boroughitis phenomenon then sweeping through Bergen County.

The borough of Wood-Ridge was created on December 6, 1894, from within the township, followed shortly thereafter by the borough of Wallington, which was formed on January 2, 1895, from portions of both Bergen Township and of Saddle River Township (now Saddle Brook).

On April 8, 1902, Bergen Township was dissolved and the remaining territory was reabsorbed by Lodi Township.

References

Sources 
"History of Bergen County, New Jersey, 1630-1923;" by "Westervelt, Frances A. (Frances Augusta), 1858-1942."
"Municipal Incorporations of the State of New Jersey (according to Counties)" prepared by the Division of Local Government, Department of the Treasury (New Jersey); December 1, 1958.

External links 
Bergen County Townships and Municipalities
Dutch Door Genealogy - Bergen County New Jersey Municipalities

Former townships in Bergen County, New Jersey
Former townships in New Jersey
1893 establishments in New Jersey